The 2007 Vietnamese National Cup (known as the Bamboo Airways National Cup for sponsorship reasons) season is the 15th edition of the Vietnamese Cup, the football knockout competition of Vietnam organized by the Vietnam Football Federation.

Pre-classified

Five teams did not play in the first round, and were automatically qualified for the round of 16.

First round
All matches in the first phase took place on February 9.

Quan khu 4 FC 0-1 TN Quang Ngai FC

DPM. Nam Dinh FC 4-0 Quan khu 5 FC

Quang Nam FC   1-0 Thanh Hóa FC

Huda Hue F.C. 0-0 Than Quang Ninh FC
[4-3 pen]

VH.Hai Phong 1-0 Hà Nội ACB
         
TCDK. SLNA 1-0 The Cong Viettel

TDCS Dong Thap F.C. 2-1 An Giang FC

DMN.SG  0-5 Binh Duong FC

Khanh Hoa FC 3-0 Tay Ninh F.C.

Can Tho FC 2-1 HA Gia Lai

TMN.CSG  4-1 T.Pomina Tien Giang

Round of 16
All matches in this phase took place on February 24.

Hòa Phát Hà Nội F.C. 1-1 TN.Quang Ngai 
[6-5 pen]

DPM. Nam Dinh FC 4-1 Quang Nam FC

Huda Hue F.C.  0-0 VH.Hai Phong 
[6-5 pen]

TCDK.SLNA  0-0 Da Nang 
[1-0 pen]

Binh Dinh FC 2-2 Dong Nai
[3-2 pen]

TDCS Dong Thap F.C. 2-1 Binh Duong FC

Khanh Hoa FC 1-0 Can Tho FC

TMN.CSG  0-2 GDT.LA

Quarter–final round

Semi-finals

Final

References

Vietnamese National Cup
Vietnam
Cup